JCSAT-3A, known as JCSAT-10 before launch, is a geostationary communications satellite operated by SKY Perfect JSAT Group (JSAT) which was designed and manufactured by Lockheed Martin on the A2100 platform.

Satellite description
The spacecraft was designed and manufactured by Lockheed Martin on the A2100AX satellite bus. It would provide communications services throughout Japan and Asia. As most satellites based on the A2100 platform, it uses a  LEROS-1C LAE for orbit raising.

Its payload is composed of eighteen 27 MHz and twelve 36 MHz Ku band plus twelve C band transponders, for a total bandwidth of 1,350 MHz. Its high-power amplifiers had an output power of 127 Watts on Ku band and　48 Watts on C band.

History
On April 20, 2004, JSAT ordered a satellite from Lockheed Martin, JCSAT-10. Based on the A2100AX platform, it would have a C band and Ku band payload and was expected to occupy the 128°East slot after its planned 2006 launch.

On August 11, 2006, an Ariane 5 ECA launched JCSAT-10 along Syracuse-3B into a transfer orbit. Upon successful deployment at 128°East longitude, it was renamed JCSAT-3A.

References

Communications satellites in geostationary orbit
Satellites using the A2100 bus
Spacecraft launched in 2006
Communications satellites of Japan
Satellites of Japan